The BZ20 Tour was a tour by Irish boy band Boyzone, celebrating the band's 20 years of existence. It included dates in England, Scotland, Singapore, Indonesia, Thailand and the Philippines. A huge contribution to the background and lead vocals came from backing vocalist Jo Garland, who has sung with Ronan Keating in his solo ventures since 2001 and with Boyzone since 2008. Her vocals have often taken the place of vocals that band member Stephen Gately sang before his death.

Background
Keith Duffy said that the group were planning another trek, as well as an album, in recognition of their 20 years in the spotlight. "We've plans in place for a tour and an album next year for the 20th anniversary – that's if people want to come and see us, We've a very loyal fan base that always come in their thousands. It's a nice set-up. We never broke up, so we can take time out to do our own thing, and then get back together when it suits". 

On 14 February, tickets were made available. It was announced that the tour had more demand than both One Direction and The Wanted. 

In January 2014, it was announced that Boyzone would make their Forest Live debut that summer, in a continuation of the celebration of the BZ20 Tour.

Support acts
Jessica Clemmons for 2013 dates
Kian Egan for 2014 dates

2013 setlist 
"Nothing Without You"
"Picture of You"
"Ruby"
"Words"
"Everything I Own"
"Rise"
"When the Going Gets Tough"
"Gave It All Away"
"Better"
"One More Song"
"Baby Can I Hold You"
"You Needed Me"
"Light Up the Night"
"The Hour Before Christmas"
"Love Will Save the Day"
"If We Try"
"Love You Anyway"
"Too Late for Hallelujah"
"Right Here Waiting"
"Love Me for a Reason"
"No Matter What"
"Who We Are"

2014 setlist
"Nothing Without You"
"Picture of You"
"Ruby"
"Words"
"Everything I Own"
"Rise"
"When the Going Gets Tough"
"Gave It All Away"
"Better"
"You Needed Me"
"Baby Can I Hold You"
"Light Up the Night"
"Love Me for a Reason"
"No Matter What"
"Love Will Save the Day"
"If We Try"
"Love You Anyway"
"Who We Are"
"Right Here Waiting"
"Life Is a Rollercoaster"

2015 setlist
"Love is a Hurricane"
"Picture of You"
"Love You Anyway"
"Baby Can I Hold You"
"Everything I Own"
"Ruby"
"Words"
"You Needed Me"
"When the Going Gets Tough"
"Gave It All Away"
"Everyday I Love You"
"I Love The Way You Love Me"
"When You Say Nothing at All"
Medley: "Tracks of My Tears", "Reach Out I’ll Be There", "You Can’t Hurry Love"
"No Matter What"
"If We Try"
"Love Will Save the Day"
"Who We Are"
"A Different Beat"
"Love Me for a Reason"
"Life Is a Rollercoaster"

|}

2017 summer shows setlist
"Picture of You"
"All That I Need"
"Ruby"
"Father and Son"
"Words"
"Isn't It a Wonder"
"Love Will Save the Day"
"Gave It All Away"
"When the Going Gets Tough"
"You Needed Me"
"Love You Anyway"
"Love Me for a Reason"
"Baby Can I Hold You"
"No Matter What"
"Who We Are"
"One More Song"
"A Different Beat"
"Life Is a Rollercoaster"

DVD release
A DVD was filmed at The O2 Arena in London from the band's Brother Tour in 2011.

BZ20 tour dates

2014, 2015, 2017 summer tour dates

References

Boyzone
2013 concert tours
2014 concert tours
2015 concert tours